Saint Catherine's Church, or Saint Catharine's Church, or variations thereof, may refer to:

Croatia 
St. Catherine's Church, Zagreb

Egypt 
St. Catherine Church, Mansheya, Alexandria
St. Catherine Church, Heliopolis, Cairo

Finland 
St. Catherine's Church, Turku

Germany 
Churches dedicated to the Saint may be called St. Katharina (mostly Catholic) or Katharinenkirche (mostly Protestant)
St. Catherine's Church, Frankfurt, Frankfurt am Main
St. Catherine's Church, Hamburg
St. Catherine's Church, Lübeck
Katharinenkirche, Oppenheim

Greece 
Church of Saint Catherine, Thessaloniki

Ireland 
St Catherine's Church, Dublin (Church of Ireland)
St Catherine's Church, Dublin (Roman Catholic)

Israel 
Church of Saint Catherine, Bethlehem

Latvia 
St. Catherine's Lutheran Church, Riga
St. Catherine's Roman Catholic Church, Riga

Malta 
St Catherine's Chapel, Mqabba
Church of St Catherine of Italy, Valletta
Church of St Catherine, Żurrieq
Church of St Catherine, Żejtun

Netherlands 
St Catherine's Cathedral, Utrecht

Poland 
St. Catherine's Church, Gdańsk
St Catherine's Church, Warsaw

Romania 
St. Catherine's Church, Bucharest

Russia 
Catholic Church of St. Catherine (Saint Petersburg)
Evangelical Lutheran Church of Saint Katarina, Saint Petersburg
The Lutheran Church of the Holy Catherine, Omsk

Slovakia 
Church of St. Catherine, Banská Štiavnica
St Catherine's Church, Dolný Kubín
Church of Saint Catherine of Alexandria

Ukraine 
St. Catherine's Cathedral, Kherson

United Kingdom

England 
 St Catherine of Siena Church, Birmingham
 St Catherine's Church, Nechells, Birmingham
 St Catherine's Church, Over Alderley, Cheshire
 St Catherine's Church, Cossall
 St Catherine's Church, Boot, Cumbria
 St Catherine's Chapel, Abbotsbury, Dorset
 St Catherine's Church, Draughton
 St Catherine's Church, Hoarwithy, Herefordshire
 St Catherine's Church, Ventnor, Isle of Wight
 St Catherine's Church, Preston-next-Faversham, Kent
St Katherine Coleman, London
St Katharine Cree, London
St Katherine Westway, Hammersmith, London
 St Catharine's Church, Scholes, Greater Manchester
 St Catherine's Chapel, Lydiate, Merseyside
 St Catharine's Church, Nottingham, East Midlands
 St Katherine's Church, Teversal, Nottinghamshire
 St Catherine's Church, Littlehampton, West Sussex
Church of St Catherine, Drayton, Somerset
Church of St Catherine, Fivehead, Somerset 
Royal Chapel of St Katherine-upon-the-Hoe, Plymouth

Wales 
St Catherine's Church, Llanfaes, Anglesey
St Catherine's Church, Canton, Cardiff
St Catherine's Church, Pontypridd

United States 
St. Catherine of Sienna Church (Riverside, Connecticut)
St. Catherine of Sienna Church (Trumbull, Connecticut)
St. Catherine of Siena Parish, Wilmington, Delaware
St. Catherine of Siena Roman Catholic Church, Detroit, Michigan
St. Katherine's Chapel, Williamston, Michigan
St. Catharine Church (Spring Lake, New Jersey)
St. Catherine of Genoa's Church (New York City)
St. Catherine of Siena's Church (New York City)
St. Catherine's Church of Lomice, North Dakota
St. Catherine of Siena (Moscow, PA), Pennsylvania

See also
St. Catherine (disambiguation)
St Catherine's Chapel (disambiguation)
St. Catherine's Priory (disambiguation)